Allan Franklin Arbus (February 15, 1918 – April 19, 2013) was an American actor and photographer. He was the former husband of photographer Diane Arbus. He is known for his role as psychiatrist Dr. Sidney Freedman on the CBS television series M*A*S*H.

Early life
Arbus was born in New York City, to a Jewish family, the son of stockbroker Harry Arbus and his wife Rose. He attended DeWitt Clinton High School in the Bronx, where he first developed an interest in acting while appearing in a student play.

Also a music lover, before becoming an actor, he was reportedly so taken by Benny Goodman's recordings that he took up playing the clarinet.

Photography career
During the 1940s, Arbus became a photographer for the United States Army. In 1946, after he completed his military service, he and his first wife, photographer Diane Arbus (née Nemerov, whom he had married in 1941), started a photographic advertising business in Manhattan. Arbus was primarily known for advertising photography that appeared in Glamour, Seventeen, Vogue, Harper's Bazaar, and other magazines, as well as the weekly newspaper advertising photography for Russeks, a Fifth Avenue department store owned by Diane's father.

Edward Steichen's noted photo exhibition The Family of Man includes a photograph credited to the couple. The Arbuses' professional partnership ended in 1956, when Diane quit the business; the couple formally separated three years later. Allan Arbus continued on as a solo photographer, but had given up the business to pursue an acting career by the time the couple divorced in 1969.

Acting career
After the breakup of his first marriage and the dissolution of his business, Arbus moved to California in 1969 to pursue a new career in acting. His new career took off after he landed the lead role in Robert Downey Sr.'s 1972 cult film, Greaser's Palace, in which he appears with Robert Downey, Jr., who would go on to star as Diane Arbus's muse in Fur. The 2006 Fur is a fictional account of the end of the Arbuses' marriage. Arbus also starred opposite Bette Davis in Scream, Pretty Peggy (1973), and was featured as Gregory LaCava in W.C. Fields and Me (1976).

These roles led to his casting as Maj. Sidney Freedman on M*A*S*H.
His work on M*A*S*H helped his career as a character actor, and he eventually appeared in more than seventy TV shows and movies. He appeared briefly in the 1973 film Cinderella Liberty as a drunken sailor; another 1973 film, Coffy (starring Pam Grier), featured Arbus as a drug dealer with strange sexual needs; in  Damien: Omen II (1978), he played Pasarian, one of Damien's many victims in The Omen trilogy. In 1979, he portrayed a dance choreographer in The Electric Horseman.

Arbus is far better known for his television work, which includes over forty-five titles, with works as recent as Curb Your Enthusiasm in 2000. Among Arbus's non-M*A*S*H work for television are guest and recurring roles in such television series as Law & Order, In the Heat of the Night, L.A. Law, Matlock, Starsky and Hutch, and Judging Amy.

Personal life
Allan and Diane Arbus had two children, photographer Amy Arbus, and writer and art director Doon Arbus. The couple separated in 1959 and divorced in 1969, two years before Diane Arbus's suicide in 1971.

Arbus married actress Mariclare Costello in 1977. The couple had one daughter, Arin Arbus, who is the associate artistic director at Theatre for a New Audience.

Death
Arbus died of congestive heart failure on April 19, 2013, in Los Angeles. He was 95. He was cremated and his ashes given to his family.

Selected TV and filmography

References

External links

1918 births
2013 deaths
Male actors from New York City
American male film actors
American male television actors
DeWitt Clinton High School alumni
Jewish American male actors
United States Army soldiers
Fashion photographers
Photographers from New York City
Russek family
United States Army personnel of World War II
21st-century American Jews